Richard John Simpson OBE (born 22 October 1942, Edinburgh) is a Scottish Labour politician, and was Member of the Scottish Parliament (MSP) for the Ochil constituency from 1999 until 2003 and for the Mid Scotland and Fife region from 2007 until 2016. He is a member of Unite.

Medical career

Simpson was educated at Perth Academy, Trinity College Glenalmond, and the University of Edinburgh.

A GP and psychiatrist prior to his election, Simpson is a fellow of the Royal College of Psychiatrists and a fellow of the Royal College of General Practitioners. He was also a former associate member of the British Association of Urological Surgeons and a member of the faculty's working group on prostate cancer.

He was a founding member and chair of the Strathcarron Hospice, Denny.

Between 2003 and 2007 he worked within Addiction medicine, first within Glasgow then as consultant psychiatrist in charge of the Drug Addiction Team of West Lothian.

Scottish Parliament
Simpson was elected in 1999 as the first MSP for Ochil. In his first term, Simpson was a member of the Finance Committee (17 June 1999 – 28 November 2001), the Standards Committee (18 October 1999 – 10 November 1999) and a member of the Health and Community Care Committee (17 June 1999 – 28 November 2001). As appointed Reporter to the Health and Community Care Committee, he produced three reports on the Stobhill Medium Secure Unit consultation process by Greater Glasgow Health Board, influenza vaccination in Scotland and organ donation. He was made the deputy Justice minister when Jack McConnell became First Minister in 2001. As a minister, Simpson launched the Scotland's People genealogy web page in 2002. He lost his seat at the 2003 election.

Simpson was returned to the Scottish Parliament in 2007 as third on the Labour regional list for Mid Scotland and Fife. He was the Deputy Party Spokesperson on Health for the Labour Party. In the 2007 parliament he was the Labour lead on the Health and Wellbeing Committee and also Co-Convener of the Cross-Party Groups in the Scottish Parliament on Drug and Alcohol Misuse and on Mental Health, and a member of the Cross-Party Groups in the Scottish Parliament on Epilepsy, Golf, Palestine, Tobacco Control and Visual Impairment. In 2007, along with other opposition MSPs, he raised concerns about plans for local licensing boards to ban under 21 alcohol sales, stating that this would discriminate against young people who were responsible drinkers.

At the election on 5 May 2011, he was again returned to Holyrood as a regional MSP for Mid Scotland and Fife. Simpson's campaigns in 2011 included 'Save Waterwatch', the undergrounding of the electricity line from Beauly to Denny and stop the running of night trains on the Stirling-Alloa-Kincardine railway line.

Simpson was appointed Officer of the Order of the British Empire (OBE) in the 2017 Birthday Honours for services to Scottish politics and public life.

References

External links
 
Richard Simpson MSP Biography at the Scottish Parliament website
Richard Simpson's official website
Richard Simpson Facebook

1942 births
Living people
Politicians from Edinburgh
Labour MSPs
Scottish psychiatrists
Members of the Scottish Parliament 1999–2003
Members of the Scottish Parliament 2007–2011
Members of the Scottish Parliament 2011–2016
Fellows of the Royal College of Psychiatrists
People educated at Glenalmond College
People educated at Perth Academy
Alumni of the University of Edinburgh
Officers of the Order of the British Empire